Ebrahim Al Mishkhas (born July 7, 1980 in Bahrain) is a Bahraini football defender. He currently plays for Al-Hala.

Al Mishkhas represented Bahrain at the 1997 FIFA U-17 World Championship in Egypt.

References 

1980 births
Living people
Bahraini footballers
Bahraini expatriate sportspeople in Qatar
Association football defenders
Expatriate footballers in Qatar
Al-Arabi SC (Kuwait) players
Expatriate footballers in Kuwait
Bahraini expatriate sportspeople in Kuwait
Al-Khor SC players
Al-Muharraq SC players
Al-Najma SC (Bahrain) players
Al Hala SC players
2011 AFC Asian Cup players
Bahrain international footballers
Qatar Stars League players
Kuwait Premier League players